Himalia Ridge is a ridge running east–west on the north side of the Ganymede Heights massif, north-east of Jupiter Glacier, in the east of Alexander Island, Antarctica. It was photographed from the air by the Ronne Antarctic Research Expedition in 1947 and mapped from these photographs by D. Searle of the Falkland Islands Dependencies Survey in 1960. The ridge was named by the UK Antarctic Place-Names Committee following British Antarctic Survey geological work, 1983–84, after Himalia, a satellite of the planet Jupiter, in association with Jupiter Glacier. The site lies within Antarctic Specially Protected Area (ASPA) No.147.

See also
 Balan Ridge
 Phobos Ridge
 Polarstar Ridge

References

Ridges of Alexander Island
Antarctic Specially Protected Areas